Christian Urs Quadflieg (born April 11, 1945 in Växjö, Sweden) is a German television actor and director. He has lived in Hamburg since 1991. His father was the German actor Will Quadflieg.

Life and career 
Christian Quadflieg attended school in Hamburg. After he finished his education with the Abitur (A-levels) he began a three-year long education at the Westfälische Schauspielschule Bochum. Between 1969 and 1973 he was a member of the theater companies in Oberhausen, Wuppertal and Basel. These were followed by work in Berlin, Hamburg, Munich, Vienna and Zürich. He was also engaged at the Salzburg Festival.

Quadflieg had roles in a great number of TV series and movies, among them Der Alte, Derrick, Das Traumschiff, Siska, Vater wider Willen and Tatort. In the 40 episodes of Der Landarzt, he portrayed the title role of Dr. Karsten Matthiesen and in 16 of these episodes he also worked as director.

He regularly tours Germany with programmes of reading the work of various poets. In recent years he has been seen less on TV, which he explains with 'his search for a better quality of his roles'. He also is the German synchronisation voice of, among others, Dean Stockwell in Paris, Texas and of Robert Taylor in Broadway Melody of 1936 and The Crowd Roars.

During his time in Oberhausen he worked under the name Christian Urs as he did not want to profit from the fame of his father Will Quadflieg, who was born and raised in Oberhausen.

Selected filmography
  (1975, TV miniseries)
  (1975, TV miniseries)
 Star Maidens (1976, TV series)
 Reifezeugnis (1977, TV)
 Derrick - Season 5, Episode 7: "Kaffee mit Beate" (1978, TV)
 Derrick - Season 6, Episode 12: "Ein Todesengel" (1979, TV)
 Derrick - Season 7, Episode 9: "Zeuge Yuroski" (1980, TV)
 Der Landarzt (1987-1992, TV series)
 Vater wider Willen (1995-2002, TV series)

References

Literature
 Deutsches Bühnenjahrbuch 1968 and 1969

External links 
 
  

1945 births
Living people
German male television actors
German male stage actors
20th-century German male actors
21st-century German male actors
People from Växjö
Waldorf school alumni